Vergèze is a commune in the Gard department in southern France. Vergèze-Codognan station has rail connections to Nîmes, Avignon and Montpellier.

Located just south-east of the commune is the production facility for Perrier, a carbonated mineral water widely sold both in France and internationally.

Population

International relations 

Vergèze is twinned with Bârlad, Romania.

See also
Communes of the Gard department
Perrier

References

Communes of Gard